The 2000 FIBA EuroLeague Final Four was the FIBA EuroLeague Final Four tournament of the 1999–2000 season. It was the second to last edition of the FIBA EuroLeague Final Fours that were organized by FIBA Europe. For the next edition of the tournament, it would be replaced by the FIBA SuproLeague's 2001 FIBA SuproLeague Final Four, and the new Euroleague Basketball competition's 2001 Finals series, which was organized by the Euroleague Basketball Company.

Panathinaikos won its second title, after defeating Maccabi Elite Tel Aviv in the final game.

Bracket

Semifinals

FC Barcelona – Maccabi Elite Tel Aviv

Panathinaikos – Efes Pilsen

Third-place game

Final

Awards

FIBA EuroLeague Final Four MVP 
  Željko Rebrača ( Panathinaikos)

FIBA EuroLeague Finals Top Scorer 
  Nate Huffman ( Maccabi Elite Tel Aviv)

FIBA EuroLeague All-Final Four Team

References

External links 
 EuroLeague 2000 at FIBA Europe website
 1999–2000 EuroLeague at Linguasport

1999-2000
International basketball competitions hosted by Greece
1999–2000 FIBA EuroLeague
1999–2000 in Greek basketball
1999–2000 in Israeli basketball
1999–2000 in Turkish basketball
1999–2000 in Spanish basketball